Ranoidea jungguy is a species of frog in the subfamily Pelodryadinae, endemic to Australia.
Its natural habitats are subtropical or tropical moist lowland forests and rivers, and it is threatened by habitat loss.

References

Litoria
Amphibians of Queensland
Taxonomy articles created by Polbot
Amphibians described in 2004
Frogs of Australia
Taxobox binomials not recognized by IUCN